The  is a museum showcasing the work of the Japanese animation studio Studio Ghibli. It is located in Inokashira Park in Mitaka, a western city of Tokyo, Japan. The museum combines features of a children's museum, technology museum, and a fine arts museum, and is dedicated to the art and technique of animation. Features include a replica of the Catbus from My Neighbor Totoro (1988), a café, bookstore, rooftop garden, and a theater for exclusive short films by Studio Ghibli.

History
Planning for the museum began in 1998. Construction started in March 2000. Upon completion, the museum opened on 1 October 2001.
Studio Ghibli director Hayao Miyazaki designed the museum himself, using storyboards similar to the ones he creates for his films. The design was influenced by European architecture such as the hilltop village of Calcata in Italy. The museum features internal and external spiral staircases built from iron, interior bridges, and balconies stretching throughout the building's height. These stairways lead to exhibits, dead ends, and across bridges. These characteristics are meant to reflect Miyazaki's building designs displayed in his film work. Miyazaki's aim was to make the building itself part of the exhibit, and for the museum to be an uplifting and relaxing experience "that makes you feel more enriched when you leave than when you entered".

Photography and video recording is prohibited inside the museum, because the museum is described as a "portal to a storybook world." Hayao Miyazaki's goal was also for people to experience the museum with their own eyes and ears.

"Let's get lost together" is the museum's slogan, derived from Hayao Miyazaki's vision for visitors to immerse themselves in his imagination and film work.

In February 2020, the museum closed temporarily as a result of the COVID-19 pandemic. The museum later re-opened to Mitaka residents only in July and later fully reopened in September.

Exhibits

Permanent exhibitions
On the bottom floor is an exhibit room showing the history and science of animation, including a three-dimensional zoetrope named "Bouncing Totoro", with models of characters from My Neighbor Totoro (1988). On the first floor is a mock-up of an animation studio. Called "Where a Film is Born," the five-room exhibit is meant to showcase the creative process of an animation filmmaker such as illustration techniques. Packed with books and toys, the room also displays drawings and illustrations that cover the walls. Another exhibit demonstrates the process of creating an animated film, with sketches, storyboarding, keyframing, cleanup, coloring and background painting.

Special exhibitions
In addition to Ghibli-oriented exhibitions, the museum hosts an area showcasing work from other studios.

Short films
The Ghibli Museum shows several short films exclusive to the Ghibli Museum. Located in the basement of the museum is The Saturn Theater. The theater has windows where automated shades lower and open before and after each showing of its short films. This is because Hayao Miyazaki designed the theater with small children in mind, who could possibly be scared of the closed in theater. The museum shows one of the following Ghibli short-films in the Saturn Theatre:
 
 
 
 
 
 
 
 
 
 

Each guest to the museum is only permitted to watch the short film once during a single visit.

Other features

Tri Hawks
Tri Hawks is a reading room and bookstore in the Ghibli Museum. Opened on February 6, 2002, it is filled with books recommended by Hayao Miyazaki. The name Tri Hawks comes from a pun based on the city's name. "Mi-taka," the city where the Ghibli Museum is located, means three hawks.

Mamma Aiuto
Mamma Aiuto, on the top of the Ghibli Museum, is the souvenir gift shop named after the band of sky pirates in the movie Porco Rosso. The name Mamma Aiuto translates to "mama, help me" in Italian, which was where Porco Rosso was set. Among other items, it sells classic and non-Japanese animation movies under the eponymous Ghibli Museum Library label.

Straw Hat Café 
The Straw Hat Café is the Ghibli Museum's only sit-down restaurant. It was created with the help of a housewife who is a mother of four; Miyazaki wanted the café's food to be "a kind of home cooking". The Café serves hot and cold foods, snacks, and desserts. Sold at the takeout section is an original alcoholic beverage: "Valley of the Wind" beer. The beer was created by a collaboration with Dairy Kingdom Oratche, a microbrewery in Tanna Basin. The beverage's label was hand drawn by Gorō Miyazaki, Hayao Miyazaki's son, who is an animation director at Studio Ghibli as well.

Catbus room
There is a playroom for children age 12 and below with a Catbus toy to play in. Its size was slightly downsized from the original scale in My Neighbor Totoro (1988) for it to fit into the museum.

Rooftop garden
On the museum's roof is a garden with a life-size, five meter tall statue of a robot from the final episode of Lupin III Part II and Castle in the Sky.
The Robot Soldier was made by the artist Kunio Shachimaru. The statue is  formed from hammered copper plate and took 2 years to create. The keystone from the movie Castle in the Sky can be found here. The keystone, bearing an inscription in Old Persian cuneiform, is a replica of the control room stone found in the floating castle, Laputa, in the movie Castle in the Sky.

Museum tickets

Tickets to the Ghibli Museum are only accepted if bought in advance. These reserve tickets can be purchased outside Japan in Hong Kong, Taiwan, Korea, North America, Europe, and Australia, and on internet by the LAWSON Ticket Online Shop, or via one of the authorized JTB Corporation locations for the respective region. Tickets go on sale on the tenth day of each month at 9:00 AM local time for reservations the following month. Reservations are strictly for the date and time purchased, and cannot be changed once booked. Tickets range from ¥1,000 for adults to ¥700 for ages thirteen to eighteen year olds, ¥400 for ages seven to twelve year olds, and ¥100 for ages four to six year olds. Ages four years old and under are free. At the museum's entry, the reserve tickets are exchanged for a 35mm film strip that features a scene from one of the Studio Ghibli films.

Fresco Painting
At the entrance of the building, the museum's ceiling is covered in a fresco painting. The painting features characters from the Studio Ghibli films such as Kiki on her broomstick from the film Kiki's Delivery Service (1989).

See also
 Ghibli Park

References

Further reading

External links

 Official website
 Background information with photographs
 Information about some of the short films shown at the museum
 
 Studio Ghibli Museum Mitaka: everything you need to know guide from Appetite For Japan

Art museums established in 2001
Art museums and galleries in Tokyo
Studio Ghibli
Children's museums in Japan
Anime and manga museums in Japan
Mitaka, Tokyo
2001 establishments in Japan